Lombard (native name: , ,  or , depending on the orthography;) is a language belonging to the Gallo-Italic family and consisting of a cluster of homogeneous dialects spoken by millions of speakers in Northern Italy and Southern Switzerland, including most of Lombardy and some areas of the neighbouring regions, notably the eastern side of Piedmont and the western side of Trentino, and in Switzerland in the cantons of Ticino and Graubünden. It is also spoken in Santa Catarina in Brazil by Lombard immigrants from the Province of Bergamo.

Origins 
The most ancient linguistic substratum that has left a mark on the Lombard language is that of the ancient Ligures. However, available information about the ancient language and its influence on modern Lombard is extremely vague and limited. This is in sharp contrast to the influence left by the Celts, who settled in Northern Italy and brought their Celtic languages and also culturally and linguistically Celticised the Ligures. The Celtic substratum of modern Lombard and the neighbouring languages of Northern Italy is self-evident, so the Lombard language is classified as a Gallo-Italic language (from the ancient Roman name for the Celts, Gauls).

Roman domination shaped the dialects spoken in the area, which was called Cisalpine Gaul by the Romans, and much of the lexicon and grammar of the Lombard language have their origin in Latin. However, this influence was not homogeneous; idioms of different areas were influenced by previous linguistic substrata and each area was marked by a stronger or weaker Latinisation, or the preservation of ancient Celtic characteristics.

The Germanic Lombardic language also left strong traces in modern Lombard, as it was the variety of Germanic spoken by the Germanic Lombards (or Longobards), who settled in Northern Italy (called Greater Lombardy after them) and other parts of the Italian Peninsula after the fall of the Western Roman Empire. Lombardic acted as a linguistic superstratum on Lombard and neighboring Gallo-Italic languages, since the Germanic Lombards did not impose their language by law on the Gallo-Roman population but rather acquired the Gallo-Italic language from the local population. Lombardic left traces, mostly in lexicon and phonetics, without Germanicising the local language in its structure, and so Lombard preserved its Romance structure.

Status 
Lombard is considered a minority language that is structurally separate from Italian, by Ethnologue and by the UNESCO Red Book on Endangered Languages. However, Italy and Switzerland do not recognize Lombard-speakers as a linguistic minority. In Italy, that is the same as for most other minority languages, which have been for long time incorrectly devalued as corrupted regional dialects of Italian although they belong to different subgroups of the Romance language family, and their historical development is not related to Standard Italian, which is derived from Tuscan.

Speakers 

Historically, the vast majority of Lombards spoke only Lombard as "Italian" was merely a literary language and most Italians were not able to read or write. Following the Italian economic miracle, Standard Italian arose throughout Italy and Lombard-speaking Switzerland, wholly-monolingual Lombard-speakers became a rarity as time went by, but a small minority may still be uncomfortable speaking Standard Italian. Surveys in Italy find that all Lombard-speakers also speak Italian, and their command of each of the two languages varies according to their geographical position as well as their socio-economic situation. The most reliable predictor was found to be the speaker's age: studies have found that young people are much less likely to speak Lombard as proficiently as their grandparents. In some areas, elderly people are more used to speaking Lombard than Italian even though they know both.

Classification 

Lombard belongs to the Gallo-Italic (Cisalpine) group of Gallo-Romance languages, which belongs to the Western Romance subdivision.

Varieties
Traditionally, the Lombard dialects have been classified into the Eastern, Western, Alpine and Southern Lombard dialects.

The varieties of the Italian provinces of Milan, Varese, Como, Lecco, Lodi, Monza and Brianza, Pavia and Mantua belong to Western Lombard, and the provinces of Bergamo, Brescia and Cremona are dialects of Eastern Lombard. All varieties spoken in the Swiss areas (both in the Canton of Ticino and the Canton of Graubünden) are Western, and both Western and Eastern varieties are found in the Italian areas.

The varieties of the Alpine valleys of Valchiavenna and Valtellina (Sondrio) and upper-Valcamonica (Brescia) and the four Lombard valleys of the Swiss canton of Graubünden have some peculiarities of their own and some traits in common with Eastern Lombard but should be considered Western. Also, dialects from the Piedmontese provinces of Verbano-Cusio-Ossola and Novara, the Valsesia valley (province of Vercelli), and the city of Tortona are closer to Western Lombard than to Piedmontese. Alternatively, following the traditional classification, the varieties spoken in parts of Sondrio, Trento, Ticino and Grigioni can be considered as Alpine Lombard, and those spoken in southern Lombardy such as in Pavia, Lodi, Cremona and Mantova can be classified as Southern Lombard.

Literature 

The Lombard variety with the oldest literary tradition (from the 13th century) is that of Milan, but Milanese, the native Lombard variety of the area, has now almost completely been superseded by Italian from the heavy influx of migrants from other parts of Italy (especially from Apulia, Sicily and Campania) during the rapid industrialization after the Second World War.

Ticinese is a comprehensive denomination for the Lombard varieties that are spoken in Swiss canton Ticino (Tessin), and the Ticinese koiné is the Western Lombard koiné used by speakers of local dialects (particularly those diverging from the koiné itself) when they communicate with speakers of other Lombard dialects of Ticino, Grigioni or Italian Lombardy. The koiné is similar to Milanese and the varieties of the neighbouring provinces on the Italian side of the border.

There is extant literature in other varieties of Lombard like La masséra da bé, a theatrical work in early Eastern Lombard, written by Galeazzo dagli Orzi (1492–?) presumably in 1554.

Usage 

Standard Italian is widely used in Lombard-speaking areas. However, the status of Lombard is quite different in the Swiss and Italian areas and so the Swiss areas have now become the real strongholds of Lombard.

In Switzerland 
 In the Swiss areas, the local Lombard varieties are generally better preserved and more vital than in Italy. No negative feelings are associated with the use of Lombard in everyday life, even with complete strangers. Some radio and television programmes, particularly comedies, are occasionally broadcast by the Swiss Italian-speaking broadcasting company in Lombard. Moreover, it is common for people to answer in Lombard in spontaneous interviews. Even some television advertisements have been broadcast in Lombard. The major research institution working on Lombard dialects is in Bellinzona, Switzerland (CDE – Centro di dialettologia e di etnografia, a governmental (cantonal) institution); there is no comparable institution in Italy. In December 2004, it released a dictionary in five volumes, covering all Lombard varieties spoken in the Swiss areas.

In Italy 

Today, in most urban areas of Italian Lombardy, people under 40 years old speak almost exclusively Italian in their daily lives because of schooling and television broadcasts in Italian. However, in rural areas, Lombard is still vital and used alongside Italian.

Lombard is spoken in Campione d'Italia, an exclave of Italy that is surrounded by Swiss territory on Lake Lugano.

Phonology 
The following tables show the sounds that are used in all Lombard dialects.

Consonants 

Vowels 

In Western varieties, vowel length is contrastive (Milanese  "to go" and  "gone"), but Eastern varieties normally use only short allophones.

Two repeating orthographic vowels are separated by a dash to prevent them from being confused with a long vowel: a-a in ca-àl "horse".

See also 
 Diachronics of plural inflection in the Gallo-Italian languages
 Emilian-Romagnol language
 Gallo-Italic of Sicily
 La Spezia–Rimini Line
 Languages of Europe
 Ligurian language
 Piedmontese language
 Pierre Bec
 Romance plurals
 Venetian language

Notes

References

Sources 
 
 
 Bernard Comrie, Stephen Matthews, Maria Polinsky (eds.), The Atlas of languages: the origin and development of languages throughout the world. New York 2003, Facts On File. p. 40.
 Brevini, Franco - Lo stile lombardo: la tradizione letteraria da Bonvesin da la Riva a Franco Loi / Franco Brevini - Pantarei, Lugan - 1984 (Lombard style: literary tradition from Bonvesin da la Riva to Franco Loi )
 Glauco Sanga: La lingua Lombarda, in Koiné in Italia, dalle origini al 500 (Koinés in Italy, from the origin to 1500), Lubrina publisher, Bèrghem.
 Claudio Beretta: Letteratura dialettale milanese. Itinerario antologico-critico dalle origini ai nostri giorni - Hoepli, 2003.
 G. Hull: "The linguistic Unity of Northern Italy and Rhaetia, PhD thesis, University of Sydney, 1982; published as The Linguistic Unity of Northern Italy and Rhaetia: Historical Grammar of the Padanian Language, 2 vols. Sydney: Beta Crucis Editions, 2017.
 Jørgen G. Bosoni: «Una proposta di grafia unificata per le varietà linguistiche lombarde: regole per la trascrizione», in Bollettino della Società Storica dell’Alta Valtellina 6/2003, p. 195-298 (Società Storica Alta Valtellina: Bormio, 2003). A comprehensive description of a unified set of writing rules for all the Lombard varieties of Switzerland and Italy, with IPA transcriptions and examples.
 Tamburelli, M. (2014). Uncovering the ‘hidden’ multilingualism of Europe: an Italian case study. Journal of Multilingual and Multicultural Development, 35(3), 252-270.
 NED Editori: I quatter Vangeli de Mattee, March, Luca E Gioann - 2002.
 Stephen A. Wurm: Atlas of the World’s Languages in Danger of Disappearing. Paris 2001, UNESCO Publishing, p. 29.
 Studi di lingua e letteratura lombarda offerti a Maurizio Vitale, (Studies in Lombard language and literature) Pisa: Giardini, 1983
 A cura di Pierluigi Beltrami, Bruno Ferrari, Luciano Tibiletti, Giorgio D'Ilario: Canzoniere Lombardo - Varesina Grafica Editrice, 1970.
 Sanga, Glauco. 1984. Dialettologia Lombarda. University of Pavia. 346pp.

External links

 Far Lombard This Lombard language association website is a place where you can learn Lombard through texts and audio visual materials.
 Lombard language digital library
 Learn Lombard online
 Learn Lombard Italian site
 Centro di dialettologia e di etnografia del Cantone Ticino.
 Repubblica e Cantone Ticino Documenti orali della Svizzera italiana. 
 Istituto di dialettologia e di etnografia valtellinese e valchiavennasca.
 LSI - Lessico dialettale della Svizzera italiana.
 RTSI: Acquarelli popolari, some video and audio documents (interviews, recordings, etc. of writers from Ticino) in Ticinese varieties (please notice that the metalanguage of this site is Italian, and that some of the interviews are in Italian rather than in Ticinese Lombard).
 UNESCO Red Book on Endangered Languages: Europe. Potentially endangered languages, where Lombard is classified as a potentially endangered language.
 VSI - Vocabolario dei dialetti della Svizzera italiana.
 in_lombard website dedicated to the Lombard language (in English)
 Lombard basic lexicon at the Global Lexicostatistical Database
 Lombard Wiktionary in incubator

 
Languages of Italy
Languages of Lombardy
Languages of Piedmont
Languages of Switzerland